The NBL1 West Coach of the Year is an annual NBL1 West award given to the best performing head coach of the regular season. Known as the State Basketball League (SBL) Coach of the Year from 1989 to 2019, the SBL was rebranded to NBL1 West in 2021.

In 2014, the Coach of the Year award for the Men's League was named in honour of John Gardiner following his death. A former Olympian, Gardiner was involved with basketball for more than 50 years as a player, coach and administrator at all levels of the game. He coached more than 400 games and won five Men's SBL championships with the Perry Lakes Hawks, including four consecutive between 2001 and 2004.

Winners

Historical records

Pre-SBL
In the pre-SBL competition, Coaches of the Year were documented for 1988.

References

Coach

Basketball coaching awards
Awards established in 1988